is a city located in Gifu, Japan. , the city had an estimated population of 58,567 in 24485 households, and a population density of 500 persons per km2. Toki is known as one of the largest producers of Japanese pottery, generally referred to as Mino ware.

Geography
Toki is located in southern Gifu Prefecture, to the southeast of Gifu City and approximately 30 kilometers north of Nagoya. The Toki River runs through the downtown area.

Climate
The city has a climate characterized by hot and humid summers, and mild winters (Köppen climate classification Cfa).  The average annual temperature in Toki is 14.9 °C. The average annual rainfall is 1902 mm with September as the wettest month. The temperatures are highest on average in August, at around 27.5 °C, and lowest in January, at around 3.2 °C.

Neighbouring municipalities
Gifu Prefecture
Tajimi
Kani
Mizunami
Mitake
Aichi Prefecture
Seto
Toyota

Demographics
Per Japanese census data, the population of Toki has declined gradually over the past 40 years.

History
The area around Toki was part of traditional Mino Province.  The history of pottery making in Toki area appears to have started more than 1300 years ago, with of Mino ware dating to the 16th century during the Azuchi-Momoyama period.  During the Edo period, much of the area was tenryō territory under the direct control of Tokugawa shogunate.  In the post-Meiji restoration cadastral reforms, Toki District in Gifu Prefecture was created, and the village of Tokiguchi was established on July 1, 1889 by the creation of the modern municipalities system. It was raised to town status on November 5, 1889 and was renamed Tokitsu. The city of Toki was incorporated on February 1, 1955, with the area formerly divided among 5 towns (Tokitsu, Oroshi, Tsumagi, Dachi, and Izumi) and 3 villages (Tsurusato, Sogi and Hida). In January 2004, a referendum held to decide whether Toki should merge with its neighboring municipalities, the cities and town of Tajimi, Mizunami and Kasahara, failed to obtain majority support.

Government
Toki has a mayor-council form of government with a directly elected mayor and a unicameral city legislature of 18 members.

Mayor 
The current Mayor of Toki is Yasunari Katō. Previous Mayors include:
Nobuhiko Ōno ( -2012)
Yasuo Tsukamoto (1983–2007)
Okizo Mizuno (1975–1983)
Yasunori Ninomiya (1955–1975)

Economy
Toki is increasing a bedroom community for nearby Gifu and Nagoya. The city is known for its production of ceramics. In Spring 2005, Toki Premium Outlets was opened on the outskirts of the city. Toki Premium Outlets is a luxury outlet mall full of name-brand stores. Besides pottery, this outlet mall is one of the biggest tourist spots. The city is home to the Large Helical Device, a stellarator investigating plasma physics with an eye towards fusion power generation.

Education
Toki has eight public elementary schools and six public middle schools operated by the city government. The city has three public high schools operated by the Gifu Prefectural Board of Education.

Transportation

Railway
 - JR Central - Chūō Main Line

Highway
 Chūō Expressway
 Tōkai-Kanjō Expressway

Sister city relations
Inside Japan
Yaizu, Shizuoka Prefecture (est. October 10, 1978, as a Sports Sister City)
International
  Faenza, Emilia-Romagna, Italy (est. October 23, 1979)

References

External links

 
Cities in Gifu Prefecture